There are roughly 50 thousand football clubs and academies operating in India. This is a list of professional football clubs located in India, with leagues and states they play in.

This is the list of AIFF approved clubs under every state football association of India

AIFF approved clubs

By league and division

Indian Super League (1st tier)

Current clubs

Defunct teams

I-League (2nd tier)

Current clubs

Former clubs

I-League 2nd Division (3rd tier)

Andhra Pradesh 
Main State League: none

Arunachal Pradesh 
Main State League: Indrajit Namchoom Arunachal League

Assam
Main State League: Assam State Premier League: Not held since 2015

Bihar
Main State League: Bihar State Soccer League

Chandigarh

Chhattisgarh
Main State League: Chhattisgarh State Men's Football League Championship

Delhi
Main State League: Delhi Senior Division

Main Women's League: FD Women's League

Goa
Main State League: Goa Professional League

Main Women's League: GFA Women's League

Gujarat
Main State League: Gandhinagar Premier League

Haryana
Main State League: Haryana State Football League

Himachal Pradesh
Main State League: Himachal Football League

Jammu and Kashmir
Main State League: JKFA Professional League

Jharkhand
Main State League: None

Karnataka
Main State League: Bangalore Super Division
 

Main Women's League: Karnataka Women's League

Kerala
Main State League: Kerala Premier League

Madhya Pradesh
Main State League: Madhya Pradesh Premier League

Maharashtra
Main State League: Various Districts league

Manipur
Main State League: Manipur State League

Meghalaya
Main State League: Shillong Premier League

Mizoram
Main State League: Mizoram Premier League

Nagaland
Main State League: Nagaland Premier League

Odisha
Main State League: FAO League

Punjab
Main State League: Punjab State Super Football League

Rajasthan
Main State League: R-League A Division

Sikkim
Main State League: Sikkim Premier Division League

Tamil Nadu
Main State League: CFA Senior Division League

Telangana
Main State League: Hyderabad Football League

Young Star association
Chelapura Bengali Association
AKJN
City College junior Football academy
Hyderabad Bengali Welfare association
Nabojagoron Sangha
SRHD Cad Cam Challengersq

Tripura
Main State League: Chandra Memorial League

Uttrakhand
Main State League:Uttarakhand Super League

Uttar Pradesh

West Bengal
Main State League: Calcutta Premier Division A

See also

 State football leagues in India
 Football in India
 Indian football league system
 All India Football Federation
 History of Indian football

References

India
 
clubs
Football clubs